Shelley Hirsch (born June 9, 1952 in Brooklyn, New York) is an American vocalist, performance artist, composer, improviser, and writer. She won a DAAD Residency Grant in Berlin 1992, a Prix Futura award in 1993, and multiple awards from Creative Capital, the Foundation for Contemporary Arts, the New York State Council for the Arts, four from NYFA and six from Harvestworks Digital Media Arts Center. She was a recipient of the Guggenheim Fellowship in Music Composition in 2017.

Life
Born and raised in New York City, Hirsch dropped out of high school and moved to San Francisco, California, where she performed with The Theater of Man under Cecile Pineda, explored extended vocal techniques, and began composing pieces for voice. In Berlin she had her first totally free improvised music concert with Sven-Åke Johansson, deepened in collaborations with  Jon Rose and - back in New York City - with Christian Marclay.

Several of Hirsch's works were commissioned by New American Radio, including #39 and The Vidzer Family (1991), and O Little Town of East New York, which was originally staged at Dance Theater Workshop in New York City (1991). As a radio play, O Little Town won first prize at the Prix Futura International Media Competition in Berlin. Hirsch performed her solo composition, States, at Alice Tully Hall  in 1999, recorded it for Roulette TV, and expanded it to include a chorus at the Golden Mask Festival in Moscow, Russia (2016).

Hirsch has appeared at festivals throughout Europe and has performed at the Kitchen, Roulette, BAM, and many other venues around and beyond New York City. She appears on the recordings of John Zorn, Elliott Sharp, Jim Staley, among 60 others, and has improvised with artists including Christian Marclay, Ikue Mori, David Weinstein and Anthony Coleman. She released the LPs Singing, mostly solo and duos with David Simons and Sam Bennett (Apollo, 1987) and the CD album Haiku Lingo (Review, 1989) with David Weinstein. In 1995, O Little Town of East New York was released on compact disc as part of the "Radical Jewish Culture" series on the record label Tzadik, followed by The Far In/Far Out Worlds of Shelley Hirsch (Tzadik 2002) and Where Were You Then? with Simon Ho (Tzadik 2012).  In 2008 her piece, "In the Basement," was included on the compilation album Crosstalk: American Speech Music (Bridge Records) produced by Mendi + Keith Obadike.

Other Hirsch collaborators include Fred Frith, Greetje Bijma, Chantal Dumas, David Moss, Jerry Hunt, Toshio Kajiwara, Jin Hi Kim, Marina Rosenfeld and Ned Rothenberg, as well as visual artists Barbara Bloom and Jim Hodges, choreographer Noémie Lafrance, and filmmakers Nina Danino (Temenos soundtrack with Sainkho Namtchylak, 2001), Zoe Beloff, Abigail Child, and Lee Sachs. She recorded with September Band (Rüdiger Carl, Hans Reichel and Paul Lovens) and with X-Communication (Butch Morris, Martin Schütz and Hans Koch), and she has recorded interpretations of works by other composers, such as Cathy Berberian's, Stripsody, and Alvin Curran's, Philharmonie.

In 2018, New York University Special Collections acquired her archive.

See also
Vocal extended technique

References

External links 
 Homepage
 Discography

Further reading 
 Barzel, Tamar. "Shelley Hirsch" (2012). Grove Music Online
 Barzel, Tamar. New York Noise: Radical Jewish Culture and the Downtown Scene. Indiana University Press, 2015.
 Hirsch, Shelley. “Wired that Way,” Arcana IV: Musicians on Music, ed. J. Zorn (New York, 2009), 157–62.
 LeBaron, Ann. “Reflections of Surrealism in Postmodern Musics,” Postmodern Music/Postmodern Thought, ed. J. Lochhead and J. Auner (New York, 2002), 27–73.

1952 births
American women composers
21st-century American composers
Avant-garde singers
Living people
Tzadik Records artists
American women in electronic music
21st-century American women singers
21st-century women composers
21st-century American singers